Thomas Zander (born 10 August 1951) is a retired German football goalkeeper.

References

1951 births
Living people
German footballers
Hertha BSC players
Wormatia Worms players
TSV 1860 Munich players
Association football goalkeepers
Bundesliga players
2. Bundesliga players
TSV 1860 Munich managers